A singing hinny or singin' hinny is a type of bannock, griddle cake or scone, made in the north of England, especially Northumberland and the coal-mining areas of the North East.  In Scotland, they are known as  fatty cutties.

Hinny is a term of endearment in the dialects of the Newcastle area.  The singing refers to the sounds of the sizzling of the lard or butter in the rich dough as it is cooked on a hot plate or griddle.

Recipe
The ingredients typically include flour, baking powder, lard or butter, currants, milk or buttermilk and salt and/or sugar to taste.  A dough is made which is rich in fat. This is then rolled into a round flat cake, which is then cooked on a flat griddle or in a skillet.

See also
 Fat rascal
 Lardy cake
 Welsh cake
 Frybread

References

English cuisine
Northumberland cuisine
Sweet breads
Scottish breads